Touškovmay refer to:

 Město Touškov, a town in Plzeň Region, Czech republic  
 Ves Touškov, a community in Plzeň-South District, Czech Republic
 Touškov, a district in Mirovice, Czech Republic